Gol Tappeh may refer to:

Ardabil Province
 Gol Tappeh, Ardabil, Ardabil County
 Gol Tappeh-ye Malali, Ardabil County
 Gol Tappeh, Kowsar, Kowsar County
 Gol Tappeh, Parsabad, Parsabad County

East Azerbaijan Province
 Gol Tappeh, Ajab Shir
 Gol Tappeh, Charuymaq-e Markazi, Charuymaq County
 Gol Tappeh, Quri Chay-ye Sharqi, Charuymaq County
 Gol Tappeh, Maragheh
 Goltappeh-ye Hasanabad
 Gol Tappeh-ye Kheyrabad

Hamadan Province
 Gol Tappeh, Hamadan
 Gol Tappeh District

Kermanshah Province
 Gol Tappeh, Kermanshah

Kurdistan Province
 Gol Tappeh-ye Taghamin, a village in Bijar County
 Gol Tappeh-ye Olya, a village in Divandarreh County
 Gol Tappeh-ye Sofla, a village in Divandarreh County
 Gol Tappeh, Kurdistan, a village in Saqqez County
 Gol Tappeh Rural District (Kurdistan Province), in Saqqez County

Markazi Province
 Gol Tappeh, Markazi

Tehran Province
 Gol Tappeh-ye Kabir

West Azerbaijan Province
 Gol Tappeh-ye Qurmish, Bukan County
 Gol Tappeh, Mahabad, Mahabad County
 Gol Tappeh, West Azerbaijan, Urmia County

Zanjan Province
 Gol Tappeh, Abhar
 Gol Tappeh, Khodabandeh,
 Gol Tappeh, alternate name of Gomesh Tappeh, Zanjan, Khodabandeh County, Zanjan Province, Iran
 Gol Tappeh, Zanjan

 Gol Tappeh Rural District (disambiguation)

See also
Kul Tepe (disambiguation)
Tappeh Gol (disambiguation)